The Nickel/Cobalt Transporter (NicO) Family is a member of the Lysine Exporter (LysE) Superfamily.

Homology 
Homologues of the NicO family have differing predicted topologies: 6, 7 and 8 TMSs. One such homologue, RcnA (YohM; TC# 2.A.113.1.1) of E. coli (274 aas) has 6 putative transmembrane segments (TMSs) in a 3 + 3 arrangement with a large hydrophilic loop between putativeTMSs 3 and 4. Several homologues of RcnA (e.g., RcnA homologue from Ralstonia solanacearum; TC# 2.A.113.1.3; CAD17703) have 7 putative TMSs (4 + 3). Still another homologue, UreH of Methanocaldococcus janaschii (TC# 2.A.113.1.4) has 6 putative TMSs in a more characteristic 3 + 3 TMS arrangement. The NicO family within the LysE superfamily may have a common origin with the TOG superfamily, having lost TMSs 1 and 4 in the 8 TMS TOG superfamily topology.

Function 
This protein is believed to catalyze Co2+ and Ni2+ efflux.

The overall reaction catalyzed by proteins of the NicO family is probably:

[Ni2+ or Co2+] (in) → [Ni2+ or Co2+] (out).

See also 
 NiCoT family, family of nickel/cobalt transporters within the TOG superfamily
 Nickel
 Cobalt
 Transporter Classification Database
 Transport protein

Further reading 
 Iwig, Jeffrey S.; Rowe, Jessica L.; Chivers, Peter T. (2006-10-01). "Nickel homeostasis in Escherichia coli – the rcnR-rcnA efflux pathway and its linkage to NikR function". Molecular Microbiology 62 (1): 252–262.doi:10.1111/j.1365-2958.2006.05369.x. ISSN 1365-2958.
 Marrero, Jeannette; Auling, Georg; Coto, Orquidea; Nies, Dietrich H. (2007-01-01). "High-level resistance to cobalt and nickel but probably no transenvelope efflux: Metal resistance in the Cuban Serratia marcescens strain C-1". Microbial Ecology 53 (1): 123–133. doi:10.1007/s00248-006-9152-7. ISSN 0095-3628. PMID 17186148.
 Protchenko, Olga; Rodriguez-Suarez, Roberto; Androphy, Rachel; Bussey, Howard; Philpott, Caroline C. (2006-07-28). "A screen for genes of heme uptake identifies the FLC family required for import of FAD into the endoplasmic reticulum". The Journal of Biological Chemistry 281 (30): 21445–21457.doi:10.1074/jbc.M512812200. ISSN 0021-9258.PMID 16717099.

References

External Links 

 The Nickel/Cobalt Transporter Family Transporter Classification Database

Protein families
Membrane proteins
Transmembrane proteins
Transmembrane transporters
Transport proteins
Integral membrane proteins